Bengt Niclas Kindvall (born 19 February 1967) is a Swedish former professional footballer who played as a striker.

Career 
Kindvall was the 1994 Allsvenskan top scorer with IFK Norrköping, which won him a contract with Hamburger SV in the German Bundesliga. A full international between 1992 and 1994, Kindvall won six caps for the Sweden national team.

Personal life 
He is the son of Ove Kindvall and brother of Tina Kindvall.

Honours
Individual
 Allsvenskan top scorer: 1994 (23 goals)

References

External links
 

Living people
1967 births
Association football forwards
Swedish footballers
Sweden international footballers
AIK Fotboll players
IFK Norrköping players
Hamburger SV players
Malmö FF players
Allsvenskan players
Superettan players
Bundesliga players
Swedish expatriate footballers
Swedish expatriate sportspeople in Germany
Expatriate footballers in Germany